Chahar Kahn (also Romanized as Chahār Kahn; also known as Chahār Kan) is a village in Fathabad Rural District, in the Central District of Baft County, Kerman Province, Iran. At the 2006 census, its population was 48, in 8 families.

References 

Populated places in Baft County